The Falls is a 1980 film directed by Peter Greenaway. It was Greenaway's first feature-length film after many years making shorts. It does not have a traditional dramatic narrative; it takes the form of a mock documentary in 92 short parts.

Plot
The world has been struck by a mysterious incident called the "Violent Unknown Event" or VUE, which has killed many people and left a great many survivors suffering from a common set of symptoms: mysterious ailments (some appearing to be mutations of evolving into a bird-like form), dreaming of water (categorised by form, such as Category 1, Flight, or Category 3, Waves) and becoming obsessed with birds and flight. Many of the survivors have been gifted with new languages.  They have also stopped ageing, making them immortal (barring disease or injury).

A directory of these survivors has been compiled, and The Falls is presented as a film version of an excerpt from that directory, corresponding to the 92 entries for persons whose surnames begin with the letters FALL-. Not all of the 92 entries correspond to a person – some correspond to deleted entries, cross references and other oddities of the administrative process that has produced the directory. One biography concerns two people – the twin brothers Ipson and Pulat Fallari, who are played (in still photographs) by the Brothers Quay.

In addition to the common VUE symptoms mentioned above, a number of themes run through the film. Among these are references to a number of bureaucratic organisations including the VUE Commission and the Bird Facilities Industries (a parody of the British Film Institute, which produced the film), the history of manned flight from Daedalus with the suggestion that birds may be responsible for the VUE (and that the film may thus be seen as a sequel to Hitchcock's The Birds), complex debates over the location of the epicentre of the VUE, and repeated references to Tulse Luper. Luper is a recurring off-stage character in Greenaway's early films, and would eventually appear on film in the epic series The Tulse Luper Suitcases (2003 onwards), which is itself named in The Falls.

The Falls includes clips of a number of Greenaway's early shorts. It also anticipates some of his later films: the subject of biography 27, Propine Fallax, is a pseudonym for Cissie Colpitts, the central figure of Drowning by Numbers (1988), while the car accident in biography 28 prefigures that in A Zed and Two Noughts (1985).

The largely formal and deadpan manner of the narration contrasts with the absurdity of the content.

Characters
Two example biographies follow.

Bwythan Fallbutus is the 42nd victim of the Violent Unknown Event listed in the VUE directory. Bwythan Fallbutus was Betheda Fallbutus' eldest son. He was the officially-appointed VUE Commission's linguistic expert. He lived just off the Goldhawk Road within a three-minute walking distance of his mother, whom he visited every day. The VUE had given Bwythan a bone-marrow deficiency, wattles and cobs along his backbone, and a foot disease that shredded his toe-nails. He could drink salt water without harm but felt listless and debilitated away from the influence of chlorophyll, which is why there were always several plantpots in his office, and even on his desk. Bwythan could speak fourteen VUE languages and interpret successfully in nine of them at a diplomatic level. It was Bwythan who had organised the examination of Agropio Fallaver, the sole speaker of the language named after him. Although Bwythan had come to the private opinion that Fallaver was somehow a fake manoeuvred by FOX, the Society for Ornithological Extermination. Bwythan has privately researched the ten-thousand most popularly used words in forty-three of the main VUE languages and has produced a comparative dictionary. From this research he wrote a book, View from Babel, to explain, or attempt to explain the gift of tongues and the fragmentation of language. In trying to do this, and in his associated search for a common linguistic denominator, he successfully demonstrated that the names of birds were important key words. It was rumoured that it was because of the conclusions of his research that Bwythan was run down by a white van, registration number NID 92, on a zebra crossing in the Goldhawk Road. A van with the same registration had been seen outside Bwythan's house an hour before the accident. The police later found the vehicle responsible on a deserted airfield. It was supposed that the assailant, or assailants, had escaped by air.

Catch-Hanger Fallcaster is one of the victims of the Violent Unknown Event listed in the VUE directory. Her biography, number 49 in the movie, is one amidst several interrelated biographies concerning different members of the Fallcaster family. Catch-Hanger Fallcaster had been a teacher. She had taught Russian to Germans. And certainly before the VUE, she would never have admitted to a great knowledge of ornithology. The VUE had made Catch-Hanger three inches taller, paralysed her index fingers and improved her eyesight. She now taught Abcadefghan to anyone who wanted to learn. Catch-Hanger has translated Tulse Luper's Some Birds of the Northern Hemisphere, establishing a definitive pronunciation of the Abcadefghan equivalents for the Falconidae. She has also started work on an Abcadefghan-English language primer that is based substantially on the three nursery rhymes, "Goosey, Goosey, Gander," "Who Killed Cock-Robin?," and "I Shot a Little Duck."

Soundtrack
The soundtrack is mainly by Michael Nyman and is partly based, like his later music for Drowning by Numbers, on the slow movement of Mozart's Sinfonia Concertante for Violin, Viola and Orchestra K. 364.  It also includes numerous clips from various songs popular among the avant-garde of the time, including pieces by Brian Eno (in particular "Golden Hours" from Another Green World) and snippets of "Jugband Blues", the last song Syd Barrett recorded with Pink Floyd.

Languages
Languages the survivors have been gifted with include:

Abcadefghan
Abcadefghan is often used in the preparation of papers on engineering, metallurgy and radiophonics. It is suggested that Sami and Finns can understand Abcadefghan, which would make Abcadefghan a Finno-Samic language but, in itself, is not that scientifically valuable since there aren't that many technical-papers in these languages. Research is required to determine the extent to which Abcadefghan is derived from or related to Abecedarian. (Curiously enough, Abecedarian is never mentioned as a VUE language in the movie). In the movie story, the language is taught by Catch-Hanger Fallcaster to "anyone who wanted to learn". She is said to have translated Tulse Luper's Some Birds of the Northern Hemisphere into Abcadefghan. The name of the language, taking the first ordered letters of the alphabet as its root, seems to have been logically inspired by its technical, industrial nature. In fact, the language actually spoken here is Estonian.
Agalese
Agreet
Allow
Allow-ease
Althuese
Antoneen
Betelguese
Candoese
Capistan
Carn-est-aero
Cathaganian
Cathanay
Curdine
Entree
Fallaver
Fallaver is the ninety-second language originated by the VUE. Fallaver began and ended with its only speaker, Agropio Fallaver, who was suggested to be an unsuspecting vehicle for FOX, the Society for Ornithological Extermination. It was Bwythan Fallbutus who conducted the investigation about Agropio Fallaver and his unique language, and had come to the conclusion that Agropio was a fake manoeuvred by FOX. See also the word palaver.
Foreignester
Glendower
Glozel
Hapaxlegomena
(a reference to Hapax legomenon)
Hartileas B.
Instantaneious Dekis
Ipostan
Itino Re
Karnash
Kantan
Katan
Kath-a-ganian
Maudine
Mickel-ease
O-Lev-Lit
(Possibly a reference to the O-level school exam)
Os-leet-ter
Orthocathalian
Regest
Sackamayer
U-thalian
Untowards
Vionester

Reception
The Falls has an 80% approval rating on Rotten Tomatoes, with Nathan Lee of The Village Voice calling it "the most playful and engaging of Greenaway's compositions".

Vincent Canby writing in the New York Times gave The Falls a mostly positive review, saying 'though The Falls is much too long for its own good, its rewards are real'.

Further reading

See also
 Lleyn, a peninsula in North Wales, and the Stamford Brook tube station in West London
 The Bridge of San Luis Rey
 the historical debate surrounding Archaeopteryx

References

External links

 The Falls, published by Dis Voir, contains the 92 biographical texts
 Gold, published by Dis Voir, 
 The Falls at petergreenaway.org.uk

1980 films
British science fiction films
Films directed by Peter Greenaway
Non-narrative films
Films scored by Michael Nyman
Surreal comedy films
1980 directorial debut films
1980s English-language films
1980s British films